Casey Hess (formerly of Doosu and Jump Rope Girls) is currently one of the guitarists for the American rock band Burden Brothers based out of Dallas, Texas.

References 

Year of birth missing (living people)
Living people
Burden Brothers members
American rock guitarists
American male guitarists
Guitarists from Ohio
Place of birth missing (living people)
Musicians from Dallas
Guitarists from Texas